Zeina Hashem Beck (Arabic: زينة هاشم بيك) is a Lebanese poet. She published five short story collections and many poems. She has won several awards including the Frederick Bock Prize in 2017 for her poem "Maqam".

Biography 
Zeina Hashem Beck is a Lebanese poet and writer. She graduated from the American University of Beirut with a Bachelor's and Master's degree in English Literature. She published five short stories collections and many poems and has won several awards over the years. In 2013, her first poetry collection "To Live in Autumn" won the Backwaters Prize and was a runner-up for the Julie Suk Award in 2014. In 2016, her chapbooks "3arabi Song" won the Rattle Chapbook Prize, and "There Was and How Much There Was) was chosen by Carol Ann Duffy for publication. In 2017, her poem “Maqam" won Frederick Bock Prize. Zeina's poetry was featured on The Academy of American Poets’ Poem-a-Day and appeared in various magazines including Ploughshares, The New York Times Magazine, The Adroit Journal, The Rialto, Poetry London, and The Southeast Review. She currently lives in Dubai where she founded and hosts the open mic night PUNCH.

Works

Short Story Collections 
 To Live in Autumn, 2013
 3arabic Songs, 2016
 There Was and How Much There Was, 2016
 Louder than Hearts, 2016

Poems 
 We Who Have Decided to Live in Autumn, 2013
 Bench, 2013
 Ghazal: Back Home, 2015
 Dismantling Grief, 2015
 Adhan, 2015
 Body, She Means It, 2016
 Layla, 2016
 In One Day and Night (original title: Fi Youm Wi Leila), 2016
 Crazy (original title: Majnun), 2016
 Say Love Say God, 2016
 There Was and How Much There Was, 2016
 Triptych: Voice, 2017
 Maqam, 2017
 There, There, Grieving, 2018
 Daily, 2018
 Prophecy, 2018
 Escape, 2018
 What the Returning Do, 2018
 Ghazal: Hands
 Dear White Critic, رفيقي في الرحيل
 Ode to the Afternoon, 2019
 Ghazal: With Prayer, 2019
 Souk, 2019
 Ode to Babel | نشيد الانتظار, 2019
 Ode to Disappointment, 2019
 Flamingos, 2019
 Ghazal: Back Home, 2019
 Poem Beginning and Ending with My Birth, 2020

Awards and honors 
 Her short story collection "To Live in Autumn" won the Backwaters Prize in 2013.
 Her short story collection "Louder than Hearts" won the May Sarton New Hampshire Poetry Prize in 2016.
 Her chapbook "3arabi Song" won the Rattle Chapbook Prize in 2016.
 Her short story "There Was and How Much There Was" was selected by Carol Ann Duffy for 2016 Smit Doorstop Leaureate's Choice.
 Her poem "Maqam" won Frederick Bock Prize in 2017.

See also 
 Afra Atiq
 Farah Chamma

References 

Lebanese writers
Lebanese poets
Living people
Year of birth missing (living people)